METRO Regional Transit Authority (METRO RTA), also known as Akron Metropolitan Regional Transit Authority, is the public transit agency serving Summit County, Ohio and the city of Akron.  It operates a number of local routes, and also operates two routes into downtown Cleveland.
Akron Metro transports passengers to/from school, work, grocery stores, malls and jobs all across Summit County. METRO RTA's fleet consists of about 200+ vehicles running on diesel, diesel-electric hybrid and as of 2022/2023, two fully electric Gillig vehicles, compressed natural gas fuels.

== ROUTE NAMES/LIST MAY CHANGE IN SUMMER OF 2023

Facilities

Head Office 
Address: 416 Kenmore Boulevard, Akron
Coordinates: 
Facilities: Head office, administration, vehicle storage and maintenance

Robert K. Pfaff Transit Center 
Address:  631 South Broadway Street, downtown Akron
Coordinates: 
Facilities: Terminus for local bus routes, suburban routes, X61 North Coast Express bus service to Cleveland, intercity Greyhound services, and Stark County & Portage County connecting buses. Youngstown’s WRTA route 81 serves as the Akron Youngstown express 
Opened: 18 January 2009

Rolling Acres Transit Center 
Address: 2340 Romig Road, Akron
Facilities: Connector hub for routes 3, 14 and 9 serving West Akron and Barberton, Ohio. This hub is in the former Rolling Acres Mall parking lot. The mall has been shut down since 2008.

Independence Transit Center  (Chapel Hill) 
Serving North Akron/Cuyahoga Falls and routes 7, 10, 12, 19, & 34, "Independence Transit Center"  is similar to Rolling Acres Transit Center which also has no public restroom but does have indoor waiting shelter facilities.

Connecting services 

METRO RTA service offers a number of connection opportunities to other area transit agencies.

GCRTA, a neighboring transit agency, provides connecting services between Cuyahoga County, Ohio (Greater Cleveland) and Akron METRO RTA. The two systems connect with one line in Brecksville on Katherine Boulevard (101), near the former VA Medical Center. GCRTA does not serve METRO RTA's Robert K. Pfaff Transit Center.

METRO RTA's "North Coast Express" route 61 connect with GCRTA routes in downtown Cleveland.

PARTA, a neighboring transit agency, offers services between Portage County, Ohio (Kent/Ravenna) and Akron, including service to METRO RTA's Robert K. Pfaff Transit Center (90), along with connections in Stow(30).

SARTA, a neighboring transit agency, operates one hourly weekday and Saturday route between Canton and Akron starting at 6:00am, 6:45am and every :45 until 8:45pm. This route, 81 Canton Akron Express, connects with METRO RTA. SARTA route 81 also serves Downtown Canton, Akron-Canton Regional Airport, Belden Village Transit Center in North Canton, Ohio, & Staples on Arlington Road in Akron from both Akron and Canton. SARTA's route services METRO RTA's Robert K. Pfaff Transit Center. Effective in 2018, SARTA also operates a direct express route in the fall and spring directly from Akron Metro Transit Center to Stark State College in North Canton  Ohio. This route is named the 88 Stark State Express and runs five times a day and services Akron Metro's RKP Downtown Transit Center Stark State College and Belden Village Transit Center respectively.

References

External links 

Bus transportation in Ohio
Transportation in Summit County, Ohio
Transportation in Akron, Ohio
Transit agencies in Ohio
1969 establishments in Ohio